Chalab-e Pain (also Romanized as Chālāb-e Pā'īn) is a village in Sar Firuzabad Rural District, Firuzabad District, Kermanshah County, Kermanshah Province, Iran. At the 2006 census, its population was 94, in 20 families.

References 

Populated places in Kermanshah County